Mount Pleasant (Tauhinukorokio) is a coastal suburb of Christchurch, New Zealand. The suburb is located on the northern flank of the mountain  Tauhinukorokio/Mount Pleasant in the Port Hills. It takes its name from the English version of the mountain's name.

The area was originally administered by the borough of Sumner.  A petition in September 1920, by 57 of the suburb's 66 ratepayers, asked for it to be included as a riding of the Heathcote County. At the time of the petition, the area was mostly farmland, with 21 dwelling houses and an estimated population of 80. Whilst the mayor of Sumner, John Barr, submitted against the petition, it was granted and took effect on 1 April 1921. As a result of the 1989 local government reforms, Heathcote County was amalgamated with and became part of Christchurch City Council.

The suburb and its houses were extensively damaged in the 2011 Christchurch earthquake.

Demographics

Mount Pleasant had a population of 3,567 at the 2018 New Zealand census, an increase of 543 people (18.0%) since the 2013 census, and a decrease of 417 people (-10.5%) since the 2006 census. There were 1,419 households. There were 1,734 males and 1,833 females, giving a sex ratio of 0.95 males per female. The median age was 48.4 years (compared with 37.4 years nationally), with 558 people (15.6%) aged under 15 years, 468 (13.1%) aged 15 to 29, 1,761 (49.4%) aged 30 to 64, and 780 (21.9%) aged 65 or older.

Ethnicities were 93.9% European/Pākehā, 4.9% Māori, 0.7% Pacific peoples, 3.6% Asian, and 2.3% other ethnicities (totals add to more than 100% since people could identify with multiple ethnicities).

The proportion of people born overseas was 24.1%, compared with 27.1% nationally.

Although some people objected to giving their religion, 57.4% had no religion, 33.3% were Christian, 0.5% were Hindu, 0.3% were Muslim, 0.7% were Buddhist and 1.8% had other religions.

Of those at least 15 years old, 1,116 (37.1%) people had a bachelor or higher degree, and 246 (8.2%) people had no formal qualifications. The median income was $46,600, compared with $31,800 nationally. The employment status of those at least 15 was that 1,527 (50.7%) people were employed full-time, 501 (16.7%) were part-time, and 57 (1.9%) were unemployed.

Education
Te Kura O Paeraki - Mt Pleasant School is a full primary school catering for years 1 to 8.

References

External links
 Local history, stories, and photos
 Mount Pleasant School
 Mount Pleasant Tennis Club
 Mount Pleasant Squash Club
 Mount Pleasant Business Directory
 Tauhinu Korokio — Mt Pleasant

Suburbs of Christchurch